Danio muongthanhensis  is a species of Danio endemic to Vietnam.

References

Danio
Fish described in 2001